The Jackson Wildcats were a United States Basketball League team located in Jackson, Mississippi. The Wildcats were originally located in Glens Falls, New York as the Adirondack Wildcats. The new ownership announced the move to Mississippi on 1 December 2006. Plans for the team to play at the Mississippi Coast Coliseum were nixed when the team and venue could not agree on a lease; the Wildcats later played some home games at a local community center.  As of May 1, 2007, the Jackson Wildcats were removed from the USBL schedule.

External links
News article about ending the Jackson Wildcats
Jackson Wildcats official site
USBL League website

United States Basketball League teams
Basketball teams in Mississippi
Sports in Jackson, Mississippi
2002 establishments in New York (state)
2007 disestablishments in Mississippi
Basketball teams established in 2002
Basketball teams disestablished in 2007